The  was a rapid transit electric multiple unit (EMU) train type operated by Osaka Municipal Subway in Japan between 1976 and 2022.

Design 
Originally introduced to the Midosuji Line as 8-car sets, trains were lengthened to 9 cars by 1987, and eventually 10 cars by 1995.

Refurbishment 
Refurbishment of the 10 series trainsets began in 1998. Ten trainsets were upgraded to use Variable-frequency drive (VVVF) technology, increasing efficiency.

Interior 
The 10 series were among the first trains powered by a third rail to be equipped with an air conditioning system.

History 
The 10 series were the main rolling stock on the Midōsuji Line since 1976.

By 1989, the fleet had reached 234 cars, including the prototype cars that initially operated on the Tanimachi Line.

Retirement of the 10 series began with the introduction of 30000 series trainsets on the Midōsuji Line in 2011. The last trainset retaining its original chopper motors (1113) was retired on 9 July 2020. As of June 2022, one trainset remained in operation. The remaining trainset (1126) was withdrawn from service in July 2022.

References 

 

Electric multiple units of Japan
10 series
10 series
Kawasaki multiple units
Kinki Sharyo multiple units
Train-related introductions in 1976
750 V DC multiple units